Saint-Jean Lynx were a junior ice hockey team which played from 1989 to 1995 in the Quebec Major Junior Hockey League. They played at the Colisée Isabelle-Brasseur. In 1982 they moved from Sherbrooke and were formerly the Sherbrooke Castors. They were known as the Saint-Jean Castors from 1982 until 1989. In 1995 they moved to Rimouski to become the Rimouski Océanic.

NHL alumni
Totals include both the St-Jean Lynx and St-Jean Castors.

Defunct Quebec Major Junior Hockey League teams
Sport in Saint-Jean-sur-Richelieu
Ice hockey clubs established in 1982
Sports clubs disestablished in 1995
1982 establishments in Quebec
1995 disestablishments in Quebec